The 6th Guldbagge Awards ceremony, presented by the Swedish Film Institute, honored the best Swedish films of 1968 and 1969, and took place on 13 October 1969. The White Game directed by Grupp 13 was presented with the award for Best Film.

Awards
 Best Film: The White Game by Grupp 13
 Best Director: Bo Widerberg for Ådalen 31
 Best Actor: Roland Hedlund for Ådalen 31
 Best Actress: Liv Ullmann for Shame
 Special Achievement: Rune Waldekranz

References

External links
Official website
Guldbaggen on Facebook
Guldbaggen on Twitter
6th Guldbagge Awards at Internet Movie Database

1969 in Sweden
1969 film awards
Guldbagge Awards ceremonies
October 1969 events in Europe
1960s in Stockholm